Adam Wilde (born 22 May 1979) is a retired English footballer.

Career

Wilde began his career at Cambridge United, making four appearances for the first team and going out on loan to Kettering Town in 1999.

Following his release by Cambridge United that year, he signed for Cambridge City, where he remained until 2002; he then signed for Worcester City, beginning a two-year stay before another transfer to Weymouth in 2004.

Now an experienced Conference player, Wilde signed for Salisbury City in 2006, however only made 12 appearances, scoring 4 goals, before transferring in the same year to St Albans City. There, Wilde made seven goalless appearances before moving to Eastbourne Borough; at Eastbourne, he settled into the first team and made 57 appearances without scoring a goal.

In 2008, he moved from Eastbourne to Sutton United; once more, Wilde would spend only a matter of months with his new club, scoring 3 goals in 15 matches, before leaving for Farnborough, where he scored twice in 19 appearances.

Following this came a season-long stint at AFC Totton, where Wilde was a regular in the first team making 42 appearances, before he moved to current club Gosport Borough in the summer of 2009.

Wilde made his 100th appearance for Gosport in a 2–0 away win over Abingdon United on 21 February 2012, and scored in his 101st appearance, a 4–1 home win over Yate Town on 25 February 2012.

In November 2016, Wilde left Gosport to return to Totton, combining his ongoing playing career with his first move into coaching as the club's assistant manager. After four years, Wilde decided to step down from the position on 28 March 2020.

References

External links

1979 births
Living people
English footballers
English Football League players
National League (English football) players
Cambridge United F.C. players
Kettering Town F.C. players
Cambridge City F.C. players
Worcester City F.C. players
Weymouth F.C. players
Salisbury City F.C. players
St Albans City F.C. players
Eastbourne Borough F.C. players
Sutton United F.C. players
Gosport Borough F.C. players
Farnborough F.C. players
A.F.C. Totton players
Association football midfielders